Shah Mansur was the last of the Muzaffarid rulers of Southern Iran. He ruled from Isfahan and was killed by the forces of Timur in 29 March 1393.

Life
Mansur was the brother of Shah Yahya and Shah Hosein. His uncle was Shah Shoja, with whom he fought against in battle.

With support from the Jalayirid Sultanate, Mansur established himself as an independent ruler in Shushtar.

Mansur's grave is located in the eastern part of Shiraz, in an area known as Gowd-e-Shahzadeh (Prince Mansur's Tomb).

References

Sources 
Jackson, Peter. "Muzaffarids."  Encyclopaedia of Islam, Volume VII (Mif-Naz). New ed. 1993. 
M. Ismail Marcinkowski, Persian Historiography and Geography: Bertold Spuler on Major Works Produced in Iran, the Caucasus, Central Asia, India and Early Ottoman Turkey, with a foreword by Professor Clifford Edmund Bosworth, member of the British Academy, Singapore: Pustaka Nasional, 2003, .
Roemer, H. R. "The Jalayirids, Muzaffarids and Sarbadars." The Cambridge History of Iran Volume 6: The Timurid and Safavid Periods. Edited by Peter Jackson. New York: Cambridge University Press, 1986. 
 
 
 
 
 
Encyclopedia of Türk - Volume 8

1393 deaths
Year of birth unknown
14th-century monarchs in the Middle East
14th-century Iranian people
Muzaffarids (Iran)
14th-century murdered monarchs